Ramrekha Mandir is a Hindu temple of Lord Ram and Goddess Sita. 

The pilgrims’ first stop of 84 kosi parikrama of Ayodhya is at Ramrekha Temple in Basti,  

This Temple is near Amorha (also known as Amorha Khas) in Basti district in the Indian state of Uttar Pradesh. Amorha Khas is a town and a Gram panchayat in Basti district.

Festivals
Almost every Hindu festival is celebrated there. Ram Navami is the major one. An annual fair comes on the 13th Day of Hindi-Month Chaitra. This attracts many pilgrimages.

Gallery

References

Ayodhya
Hindu temples in Uttar Pradesh
Basti district
Rama temples